Warwickia is a genus of May beetles and junebugs in the family Scarabaeidae, containing one described species, Warwickia pilosa.

References

Further reading

 
 
 
 
 

Melolonthinae
Monotypic Scarabaeidae genera
Articles created by Qbugbot